Customizable, Ubiquitous Real Time Communication over the Web is an API definition being drafted by Bernard Aboba at Microsoft. It is a competing standard to WebRTC, which drafted by a World Wide Web Consortium working group since May 2011.

External links
 Draft Proposal at W3C List
 Current Draft 

Web development